Cyrus Isadore Harvey Jr. (October 14, 1925 – April 14, 2011) was an American film distributor and business entrepreneur, he was the co-founder of Janus Films in 1956, and part-owner of the Brattle Theatre with his longtime business partner film producer and actor Bryant Haliday. Born in Cambridge, Massachusetts, he was the son of Jewish immigrants. He helped introduce American viewers to foreign art movies from many countries including Japan, Italy, France, Spain and Sweden.

Biography
At the end of World War II, Harvey served as a navigator in the United States Air Forces, though he did not serve overseas. After the war he graduated from Harvard University, where he studied history and literature. After graduation, he went to Paris.

In addition to his business interests being a film distributor,  he founded the now international retailer Crabtree and Evelyn, that specialises in body and home products.

Cyrus Harvey Jr. died in Dayville, Connecticut, on April 14, 2011, of a stroke suffered four days earlier. He is survived by his second wife, a sister, three daughters, and five grandchildren.

See also
 Janus Films
 Brattle Theatre
 Bryant Haliday

References

External links
 Janus Films founder Cyrus Harvey dies, Variety
 Janus Films
 Brattle Theatre

1925 births
2011 deaths
Businesspeople from Cambridge, Massachusetts
People from Woodstock, Connecticut
Harvard University alumni
Businesspeople from Connecticut
Film distributors (people)
United States Army Air Forces personnel of World War II
American people of Polish-Jewish descent
20th-century American businesspeople
United States Army Air Forces officers
Military personnel from Massachusetts